Janie  is a short film, written and directed by Christine Shin. Janie was selected as the 2005 Charles and Lucille King Finishing Fund.
Janie, a 9-year-old girl, has a perfect life as an only daughter in a loving family. Her life, however, gets completely shattered when Ben, the little brother she never knew existed, unexpectedly shows up to live with her family.
Janie was first released in the United States on February 26, 2006 as a part of the East Lansing Children's Film Festival, which is an offshoot of the East Lansing Film Festival. It stars Blaine Saunders, Tanner Maguire, Deborah Quayle, John Miailovich, and Katrina Feickert.

Synopsis
Janie, a 9-year-old girl, has a perfect life as an only daughter in a loving family. Her life, however, gets completely shattered when Ben, the little brother she never knew existed, unexpectedly shows up to live with her family.

Cast
 Blaine Saunders as Janie
 Tanner Maguire as Ben
 Deborah Quayle as Grace
 John Miailovich as Richard
 Kabrina Feickert as Ben's Mother

Festivals and awards
Janie has received various awards and has been invited to screen at many festivals such as:
 Cine ser Para - Argentina (November 2009)
 Tel Aviv International Student Film Festival - Israel (May 2008)
 Monaco Charity Film Festival - Europe (May 2008)
 Korean American Film Festival - New York (February 2008)
 Pensacola International Film Festival (October 2007)
 LA Femme Film Festival (October 2007)
 Amador Film Festival (September 2007)
 Temecula Valley International Film & Music Festival (September 2007)
 Riverside Multicultural Youth Festival (April 2007)
 First Look Film Festival (April 2007)
 Delray Beach Film Festival (March 2007)
 Riverside International Film Festival (March 2007)
 Big Muddy Film Festival (February 2007)
 International Family Film Festival (February 2007) - FINALIST: Best Student Drama Category
 Water Tower Screening at Warner Bros. Lot (December 2006)
 Northampton Independent Film Festival (November 2006)
 Ohio Independent Film Festival (November 2006)
 New Voices Across the Pacific Screening at USC East Asian Studies Center (November 2006)
 Heartland Film Festival (October 2006)
 TV Premiere on KCET - 2006 Fine Cut Series (October 2006)
 FAIF International Film Festival (October 2006)
 Los Angeles Korean International Film Festival (September 2006)
 Goyang International Children's Film Festival (September 2006)
 Los Angeles International Short Film Festival (September 2006)
 Danceswithfilms Festival (July 2006) - WINNER: Fusion Short Audience Award
 KIDS FIRST! Film & Video Festival (July 2006)
 Cine Golden Eagle Award - WINNER (July 2006)
 Asian American International Film Festival (July 2006)
 Danville International Children's Film Festival (May 2006) - WINNER: Best Short Award
 Cannes Short Film Corner (May 2006)
 USA Film Festival (May 2006) - FINALIST: National Short Film & Video Competition
 Maryland Film Festival (May 2006)
 VC FilmFest (May 2006)
 Rochester International Film Festival (May 2006)
 Arizona International Film Festival (April 2006) - SELECTED: BEST OF FEST
 Newport Beach Film Festival (April 2006)
 Worldfest Houston Independent Film Festival (April 2006) - WINNER: Gold Remi Award in Short Film for Family & Children Category
 Palm Beach International Film Festival (April 2006)
 Tiburon International Film Festival (March 2006)
 East Lansing Children's Film Festival (February 2006)
 Cinequest Online - Viewers' Voice (February 2006)
 Clermond-Ferrand Short Film Market (February 2006)
 The Caucus for Television Producers, Writers, & Directors Foundation Grant - WINNER (January 2006)
 Charles & Lucille King Family Foundation Grant - WINNER (August 2005)
 Fotokem Student Filmmaker Grant - WINNER (September 2004)

References

External links
 
 Janie official website

2006 short films
2006 films
Films about Asian Americans
American coming-of-age films
2000s English-language films
2000s American films